Ángel Yesid Camargo Ochoa (born May 22, 1967) is a Colombian former road racing cyclist, who was a professional from 1992 to 1998. H rode in two editions each of the Tour de France, the Giro d'Italia and the Vuelta a España.

Major results

1990
 1st Stage 3 Vuelta a Colombia
1991 
 1st  Overall Vuelta al Táchira
 2nd Overall Vuelta a Boyacá 
 2nd Overall Vuelta a Cundinamarca
1992
 1st Stage 2 Grand Prix du Midi Libre
 1st Stage 4 Vuelta a Colombia
 10th Clásica de Almería
1993
 3rd Clásica a los Puertos
1994
 1st Stage 10 Vuelta a España
 4th Overall Setmana Catalana de Ciclisme
 8th Overall Vuelta a Burgos
1996
 3rd Overall Vuelta a Boyacá
1998
 2nd Overall Vuelta a Boyacá
1999
 1st Overall Clásica de Fusagasugá
 1st Overall Vuelta a Cundinamarca
2001
 2nd Overall Vuelta a Boyacá

References
 

1967 births
Living people
Colombian male cyclists
Vuelta a Colombia stage winners
Colombian Vuelta a España stage winners
Sportspeople from Boyacá Department